The NESS Energy Project is an incinerator currently under construction in Aberdeen, UK. It is situated in East Tullos Industrial Estate on a site formerly used for gas storage.

History 
In February 2022, construction workers staged a walkout in a dispute over unpaid wages.

Operation 
The facility is designed to burn up to 150,000 tonnes of material per year, consisting of non-recyclable waste from Aberdeen City Council, Aberdeenshire Council, and Moray Council.

The facility will be operated by Acciona, who were awarded a contract worth approximately 400 million euros (£371 million) for the construction of the facility and its operation over 20 years. The incinerator bottom ash produced by the facility will be transported by road to the site of the former Cairnrobin quarry near Portlethen, where it will be stored and processed.

References 

Buildings and structures in Aberdeen
Waste power stations in Scotland